Events from the year 1797 in France.

Incumbents
 The French Directory

Events
14 January-15 January - Battle of Rivoli, decisive French victory over Austria.
19 February - Treaty of Tolentino signed between France and the Papal States.
22 February - The Last invasion of Britain begins. French forces under the command of American Colonel William Tate land near Fishguard in Wales.
25 February - Tate surrenders at Fishguard.
16 March - Battle of Tagliamento, French victory over Habsburg Austria.
21-23 March - Battle of Tarvis, French victory over Austria.
17 April - Treaty of Leoben, preliminary accord between France and Austria.
18 April - Battle of Neuwied, French victory over Austria.
20 April - Battle of Diersheim, French victory over Austrian forces.
12 May - France conquers Venice, ending the 1100 years of independence of the city.
17 October - Treaty of Campo Formio signed between France and Austria.
17 December - Napoleon leads a successful French charge against Fort l'Aiguilette to secure Toulon.

Births
27 March - Alfred de Vigny, poet, playwright, and novelist (died 1863)
16 April - Adolphe Thiers, politician, historian and Prime Minister of France (died 1877)
27 April - Jean Victoire Audouin, naturalist, entomologist and ornithologist (died 1841)
10 September - Benjamin Nicolas Marie Appert, philanthropist (died 1847)
6 November - Gabriel Andral, pathologist (died 1876)

Deaths
11 February - Antoine Dauvergne, composer and violinist (born 1713)
17 May - Michel-Jean Sedaine, dramatist (born 1719)
27 May 
François-Noël Babeuf, political agitator and journalist, executed (born 1760)
Augustin Alexandre Darthé, Revolutionary, executed (born 1769)
18 November - Jacques-Alexandre Laffon de Ladebat, shipbuilder and merchant (born 1719)

See also

References

1790s in France